Lucknow Cantt. is a constituency of the Uttar Pradesh Legislative Assembly covering the cantonment part of the city of Lucknow in Lucknow district of Uttar Pradesh, India.

Lucknow Cantt. is one of five assembly constituencies in the Lucknow Lok Sabha constituency. Since 2008, this assembly constituency is numbered 175 amongst 403 constituencies.

Currently this constituency is represented by Brajesh Pathak, who won in 2022 Uttar Pradesh Legislative Assembly election. The current MLA of this constituency is also serving as the Deputy Chief Minister of the state.

Members of Legislative Assembly

Election results

2022

2019 by election

2017

2012

2007

2002

1996

1993

1991

1989

References

Assembly constituencies of Uttar Pradesh